Botë e padukshme is a 1987 Albanian drama film directed and written by Kristaq Dhamo with Vath Koreshi.

Cast

Eva Alikaj
Roza Anagnosti
Vangjel Heba
Robert Ndrenika
Stavri Shkurti
Kristaq Skrami

External links
 

1987 films
1987 drama films
Albanian-language films
Films directed by Kristaq Dhamo
Albanian drama films